Vernal is an unincorporated community in Greene County, Mississippi, United States.

Vernal was one of the earliest settled areas of Greene County and was named for an early settler from Scotland. It was once home to Vernal Male and Female Academy, the Vernal School, and the Vernal Consolidated Rural School.

A post office operated under the name Vernal from 1843 to 1956.

The Vernal Presbyterian Church is listed on the National Register of Historic Places.

Notable people
Mack McInnis, Mississippi legislator

Notes

Unincorporated communities in Greene County, Mississippi
Unincorporated communities in Mississippi